Jung Yu-mi (born January 18, 1983) is a South Korean actress. Jung made her feature film debut in Blossom Again (2005), for which she received acting recognition. She has since starred in the critically acclaimed films Family Ties (2006), Chaw (2009), My Dear Desperado (2010), and the box office hits The Crucible (2011), Train to Busan (2016) and Kim Ji-young: Born 1982 (2019). She also frequently appears in films by auteur Hong Sang-soo, notably Oki's Movie (2010) and Our Sunhi (2013). Jung has drawn praise for her unique screen presence and versatility.

For her works in film, Jung won the Best New Actress award at the Baeksang Arts Awards, Best Supporting Actress at the Blue Dragon Film Awards and Best Actress at the recent 56th Grand Bell Awards.

Career
Jung Yu-mi made her acting debut in short films, notably How to Operate a Polaroid Camera. Shortly after, the then-aspiring actress impressed critics in the feature film Blossom Again, in which she gave an engrossing performance as an emotionally vulnerable teenager experiencing her first love, and thus received several newcomer awards that year. Her next film Family Ties was also critically acclaimed, for which she won Best Supporting Actress at the Blue Dragon Film Awards.

Jung's filmography is a diverse mix of arthouse indies such as The Room Nearby and Cafe Noir, cult monster flick Chaw, odd-couple romantic comedy My Dear Desperado, and melodrama Come, Closer. The Crucible (also known as Silenced), inspired by true events about a group of handicapped children who suffer physical and sexual abuse at the hands of their teachers, drew nearly 5 million viewers and became one of the highest-grossing films that Jung has starred in. Her ability to portray the lives of ordinary people in ways that are not ordinary have made her one of the most sought-after actresses for auteurial films, as evidenced by her continued collaboration with director Hong Sang-soo. She played the titular character in Hong's Oki's Movie (2010) and Our Sunhi (2013), where her fragile appeal is underpinned by a quiet strength and straightforwardness. Oki's Movie premiered at the 67th Venice Film Festival, while Our Sunhi premiered at the 66th Locarno International Film Festival. In 2015, she starred in the female-centric indie film The Table directed by Kim Jong-kwan, which premiered at the 21st Busan International Film Festival.

Jung has also starred in several commercial films, such as Manhole (2014), where she plays a killer. She was cast in the zombie thriller Train to Busan (2016) directed by Yeon Sang-ho, which premiered at the Cannes Film Festival. The film was a major success, surpassing 10 million audiences. Jung reunited with Yeon in another film, Psychokinesis, a black comedy which premiered in 2018.

Though much less prolific in television, Jung uses her quirky, offbeat image to great effect when playing peculiar but adorable characters in Que Sera, Sera (2007), I Need Romance 2012, and Discovery of Love (2014). In 2018, Jung starred in the tvN drama Live, written by Noh Hee-kyung where she played a police officer.

Jung also showcased her sweet singing voice through the song "Andromeda" with Sung Si-kyung in 2016. They later did a live duet of the song in You Hee-yeol's Sketchbook in 2017.

In 2019, Jung starred in the feminist film Kim Ji-young: Born 1982 based on the best-selling novel of the same title. The film was released in October 2019.

In 2020, Jung will play the titular role in Netflix's series The School Nurse Files.

Filmography

Film

Television series

Television  show

Music video

Discography

Singles

Awards and nominations

Listicles

References

External links

 
 
 

21st-century South Korean actresses
South Korean film actresses
South Korean television actresses
South Korean television personalities
South Korean web series actresses
Seoul Institute of the Arts alumni
1983 births
Living people
People from Busan